The Church of Jesus Christ of Latter-day Saints in Nebraska refers to the Church of Jesus Christ of Latter-day Saints (LDS Church) and its members in Nebraska. 
The official church membership as a percentage of general population was 1.29% in 2014. According to the 2014 Pew Forum on Religion & Public Life survey, roughly 1% of Nebraskans self-identify themselves most closely with the LDS Church. The LDS Church is the 6th largest denomination in Nebraska.

Stakes are located in Kearney, Lincoln, and Omaha (3).

History
Members of the LDS Church first traveled to what is now the state of Nebraska in 1846. Following the  succession crisis in 1844, members of the church who followed Brigham Young left Nauvoo, Illinois in the spring of 1846. Due to difficulty crossing Iowa, they spent the winter of 1846-47 in encampments across Iowa and Nebraska. Winter Quarters, on the Nebraska side of the Missouri River, became an important stopping site for church members in the their trek towards the Great Basin.

Following the Transcontinental railroad being built through Nebraska, LDS Church presence in Nebraska was rather limited. The first branch following the pioneer period was organized in Fremont in 1877, and a branch was established in Omaha by 1900. The first stake of the church was organized in 1960 in Omaha, with congregations being in several cities across the state. Stakes have since been created in Lincoln, Kearney, and the suburbs around Omaha.

Stakes
As of February 2023, the following Stakes had Stake Centers in Nebraska:

Stakes with stake center outside of the state but had congregations in Nebraska

Missions
The large majority of Nebraska are located in the Nebraska Omaha Mission. Congregations in Nebraska pertaining to the Rapid City South Dakota Stake are located in the North Dakota Bismarck Mission, while those in the Cheyenne Wyoming East Stake are located in the Colorado Fort Collins Mission.

Temples

The Winter Quarters Nebraska Temple was dedicated on April 22, 2001, by church president Gordon B. Hinckley. The large majority of the state is located in this temple district, although a few congregations are located Fort Collins Colorado and Bismarck North Dakota Temple Districts.

See also

 The Church of Jesus Christ of Latter-day Saints membership statistics (United States)
Nebraska: Religion
Blaine County, Nebraska

References

External links
 Newsroom (Nebraska)
 ComeUntoChrist.org Latter-day Saints Visitor site
 The Church of Jesus Christ of Latter-day Saints Official site

Latter Day Saint movement in Nebraska
Nebraska